Tenagodes is a genus of sea snails with irregularly coiled shells, marine gastropod mollusks in the family Siliquariidae, the slit worm snails.

Species
Species within the genus Tenagodes include:
 Tenagodes lacteus
 Tenagodes trochlearis

References

Siliquariidae